Ananda is a town in east-central Ivory Coast. It is a sub-prefecture of Daoukro Department in Iffou Region, Lacs District.

Ananda was a commune until March 2012, when it became one of 1126 communes nationwide that were abolished.

In 2014, the population of the sub-prefecture of Ananda was 12,020.

Villages
The 12 villages of the sub-prefecture of Ananda and their population in 2014 are:

References

Sub-prefectures of Iffou
Former communes of Ivory Coast